The 15th AVN Awards ceremony, organized by Adult Video News (AVN), took place January 10, 1998 at Caesars Palace, in Paradise, Nevada, U.S.A. During the show, AVN presented AVN Awards (the industry's equivalent of the Academy Awards) in 54 categories honoring the best pornographic films released between Oct. 1, 1996 and Sept. 30, 1997. The ceremony was produced by Gary Miller and directed by Mark Stone. Comedian Robert Schimmel hosted, with adult film actresses Racquel Darrian and Misty Rain as co-hosts. At a pre-awards cocktail reception held the previous evening, 50 more AVN Awards, mostly for behind-the-scenes achievements, were given out by hosts Nici Sterling and Dave Tyree, however, this event was neither televised nor distributed on VHS tapes as was the main evening's ceremony. Both events included awards categories for gay movies; the final year the show included both gay and heterosexual awards. The gay awards were subsequently spun off into a separate show, the GayVN Awards.

Zazel won the most awards with seven, however, Bad Wives, which received six statuettes, won for best film. Buda won for best shot-on-video feature. Nic Cramer won Best Director—Film for Operation Sex Siege.

Winners and nominees

The winners were announced during the awards ceremony on January 10, 1998. Besides winning best film, Bad Wives also won Best Actress for Dyanna Lauren, Best Actor for Steven St. Croix and Best Screenplay for Dean Nash. Zazel was named best all-sex film and Naked Highway was the best gay video. Johnni Black won Best New Starlet, while Performers of the Year were: Stephanie Swift, female; Tom Byron, male; and Jim Buck, gay.

Major awards

Winners are listed first, highlighted in boldface, and indicated with a double dagger.

Additional award winners

These awards were announced, but not presented, in a winners-only segments read by Robert Schimmel and Misty Rain during the event. Recipients' awards were distributed off-stage:

 Best All-Girl Series: Diva
 Best Anal Sex Scene—Film: Steven St. Croix, Dyanna Lauren; Bad Wives
 Best Anal Sex Scene—Video: Careena Collins, Mark Davis, Sean Michaels; Butt Banged Naughty Nurses
 Best Anal-Themed Feature: Gluteus to the Maximus
 Best Boxcover Concept: Ancient Secrets of the Kama Sutra, Vivid Video
 Best Continuing Video Series: Fresh Meat
 Best Director—Foreign: Pierre Woodman, The Fugitive 1 & 2
 Best Ethnic-Themed Video: Midori's Flava
 Best Featurette Tape: Heart & Soul
 Best Foreign Featurette Tape: Private Stories 22
 Best Gangbang Tape: Gangbang Girl 19
 Best Gonzo Series: Tom Byron's Cumback Pussy
 Most Outrageous Sex Scene: Mila, Kiss, "Anal Food Express", My Girlfriend's Girlfriends
 Best Overall Marketing Campaign—Company Image: VCA Pictures
 Best Overall Marketing Campaign—Gay Video: Family Values, Men of Odyssey
 Best Overall Marketing Campaign—Individual Title or Series: Zazel, Cal Vista Films/Metro
 Best Packaging—Film: Paris Chic, Studio A Entertainment
 Best Packaging—Video: Makin' Whoopee, Cal Vista Video/Metro
 Best Sex Scene—Foreign: Double Ship Orgy, Private Stories 16
 Best Solo Sex Scene: Vicca, Diva
 Best Tease Performance: Silvia Saint, Fresh Meat 4

The previous night, January 9, 1998, during AVN's pre-awards cocktail reception, hosts adult film actress Nici Sterling and comedian Dave Tyree handed out these awards, mostly for behind-the-scenes excellence:

 Best Actor—Gay Video: Jim Buck, Naked Highway
 Best Advertisement: The World's Luckiest Man, Hustler/Vivid
 Best Alternative Adult Feature Film: Crash
 Best Alternative Adult Film Featurette or Specialty Tape: Jenny McCarthy: The Playboy Years
 Best Alternative Adult Video: 10th Anniversary Colorado River Wet T&A, Vols. 1 & 2
 Best Amateur Series: Catalina L'Amour
 Best Amateur Tape: Southern Belles 8
 Best Art Direction—Film: Zazel
 Best Art Direction—Gay Video: Doin' Time 2069, Part 2
 Best Art Direction—Video: New Wave Hookers 5
 Best Bisexual Video: Night of the Living Bi Dolls
 Best Boxcover Concept—Gay Video: Matador, All Worlds Video
 Best CD-ROM Graphics/Art Direction: UltraVixen
 Best CD-ROM Photo Disc: Super Models 1
 Best Cinematography: Philip Mond, Zazel
 Best Compilation Tape: The Voyeur's Favorite Blow Jobs & Anals
 Best Director—Bisexual Video: Josh Eliot, Night of the living Bi Dolls
 Best Editing—Film: James Avalon, Zazel
 Best Editing—Gay Video: Wash West, Dr. Jerkoff & Mr. Hard
 Best Editing—Video: John Leslie, Drop Sex: Wipe the Floor
 Best Explicit Series: Filthy Fuckers
 Best Gay Alternative Release: Summer, The First Time
 Best Gay Solo Video: Titan Men—Alone in the Backwoods
 Best Gay Specialty Release: Fallen Angel
 Best Interactive CD-ROM (Game): Dadahouse
 Best Interactive CD-ROM (Non-Game): Virtual Sex with Asia
 Best Music: Toshi Gold, Skin 11: Unbound
 Best Music—Gay Video: Tom Alex and Sharon Kane, A Love Story
 Best Newcomer—Gay Video: Jim Buck
 Best Non-Sex Performance—Film or Video: Jamie Gillis, New Wave Hookers 5
 Best Non-Sex Performance—Gay, Bi or Trans Video: Sharon Kane, Family Values
 Best Original CD-ROM Concept: Fischer's Erotic Encyclopedia
 Best Packaging—Gay Video: Tailspin, Studio 2000
 Best Packaging—Specialty: Spiked Heel Diaries 8, Bizarre Video
 Best Pro-Am Series: Filthy First Timers
 Best Pro-Am Tape: More Dirty Debutantes 71
 Best Screenplay—Film: Dean Nash, Bad Wives
 Best Screenplay—Gay Video: Wash West, Naked Highway
 Best Screenplay—Video: Jonathan Morgan, Crazed
 Best Sex Scene—Gay Video: Jeff Stryker, Derek Cameron; Jeff Stryker's Underground
 Best Special Effects: New Wave Hookers 5
 Best Specialty Tape—Big Bust: Mandy Mountjoy Does Hardcore
 Best Specialty Tape—Bondage: Kym Wilde's On the Edge 40
 Best Specialty Tape—Other Genre: Hardcore Male/Female Oil Wrestling
 Best Specialty Tape—Spanking: Disciplined by the Cane
 Best Supporting Performer—Gay Video: Bo Summers, Family Values
 Best Trailer: New Wave Hookers 5
 Best Trans Video: I Dream of Queenie
 Best Videography: Justin Sterling, Barry Harley; Diva, The Series
 Best Videography—Gay Video: Wash West, Naked Highway

Honorary AVN Awards

Special Achievement Awards
 Al Goldstein, "for his lifelong defense of the First Amendment"
 Christy Canyon, "for her lifetime achievement in the adult video industry"
 Dave Friedman, "one of the founding fathers of the adult film and video industries"

AVN Breakthrough Award
Presented to Steve Orenstein of Wicked Pictures; the other nominees were Robert Black and Tom Byron

Hall of Fame
AVN Hall of Fame inductees for 1998, announced during AVN's pre-awards cocktail reception, were: 
Lois Ayres, Rene Bond, Jerry Butler, Careena Collins, Jon Dough, Jerry Douglas, Roy Karch, Keisha, Dorothy LeMay, Chelsea Manchester, Constance Money, Paul Norman, Jace Rocker, Derek Stanton, Jane Waters, Bambi Woods

Adult Internet Awards
The 1998 Adult Internet Awards winners were announced at another time later in the year and were not part of the show:

 Best Overall Site: Fuck Force 5 (FF5)
 Best Overall Gay Site: Chisel Media
 Best Live Video Feed: Python Communications Inc.
 Best Live Video Service Bureau: BabeNet Ltd.
 Best Pictorial Site: Kara's Adult Playground
 Best Performer or Personal Site: Danni's Hard Drive
 Best Use of Plug-ins: Fuck Force 5 (FF5)
 Best Animation: Fuck Force 5 (FF5)
 Best Customer Service Department: BabeNet
 Best Clickthrough Program: Smart Bucks
 Most User-Friendly Site: Manzone
 Best Graphics: Adult Online Network

 Best Retail Site: Adult DVD Xtreme
 Best Marketing Campaign: Purehardcore
 Best Links Site: Persian Kitty's Adult Links
 Best E-Zine: Vavoom
 Best Video-on-Demand Interface: Slut TV
 Best Chat Interface: Python Premium Pack
PEOPLE'S CHOICE AWARDS:
 Best Free Site: Web Voyeur
 Best Free Pictorial Site: Collectors Gallery
 Best Free Performer or Personal Site: Asia Carrera's Buttkicking Homepage

Multiple nominations and awards

Zazel won the most awards with seven; Bad Wives was next with six statuettes.New Wave Hookers 5 scored five.

Presenters and performers

The following individuals presented awards or performed musical numbers or comedy. Presenters of the gay awards were not recorded. The show's trophy girls were Candy Roxxx and Katie Gold.

Presenters (in order of appearance)

Performers

Ceremony information

While accepting her Lifetime Achievement Award, Christy Canyon announced her official retirement.

Among the people participating in production of the ceremony, Mark Stone also served as musical director; an opening video entitled "History" was produced by Steve Austin and Serenity was responsible for choreography.

The ceremonies were published on VHS tapes by both VCA Pictures and Playboy Entertainment Group. The Playboy tape includes softcore scenes from the winning movies, while the VCA tape features hardcore scenes of the winners. The awards show was also rebroadcast over the Internet by High Society magazine via cun-tv.com on May 16, 1998.

The 1998 AVN Awards later achieved an unexpected shot of mainstream coverage when David Foster Wallace attended the ceremony as part of his overall exploration of pornography's place (or non-place) in American society as the 20th century was nearing its end. Wallace wrote about the event and some matters connected to in an article entitled "Neither Adult Nor Entertainment" published under a pseudonym in the September 1998 issue of Premiere magazine. The article was later collected in Wallace's 2005 nonfiction collection Consider the Lobster under the title "Big Red Son."

Critical reviews

Some attendees were critical of the show's length. In a posting to the Rec.Arts.Movies.Erotica Usenet newsgroup, Tim Evanson noted, "The length of the show was again a concern (the number of heterosexual
categories is quiet large), and the number of gay industry insiders
attending the awards dipped slightly this year."

In Memoriam
AVN publisher Paul Fishbein paid tribute to the passing of adult industry businessman Reuben Sturman during the show.

See also

 AVN Female Performer of the Year Award
 AVN Award for Male Performer of the Year
 AVN Award for Male Foreign Performer of the Year
 List of members of the AVN Hall of Fame

Notes

Bibliography

External links
 
 Adult Video News Awards  at the Internet Movie Database
 
 
 

AVN Awards
1997 film awards
AVN Awards 15